Enrique "Quique" Setién Solar (born 27 September 1958) is a Spanish football manager and former player who played as a central midfielder. He is the current manager of La Liga club Villarreal.

As a player, he was nicknamed El Maestro, and was best known for his two spells with Racing de Santander, starting and finishing his 19-year professional career at the club. Over 15 seasons in La Liga, he played 374 matches and scored 58 goals. He also won three international caps for Spain.

Setién started a managerial career in 2001, going on to coach several teams including Racing. Starting in January 2020, he was in charge of Barcelona for seven months, being dismissed following an 8–2 loss against Bayern Munich in the UEFA Champions League.

Playing career

Club
Born in Santander, Setién made his La Liga debut in 1977, with his hometown club Racing de Santander. During his first spell with the Cantabrians, although he played regularly, he was not yet a regular starter, and he missed the entire 1982–83 season as well as being relegated twice.

Afterwards, Setién represented Atlético Madrid for three years. He enjoyed a good first two seasons, but appeared rarely in his last after some spats with elusive club chairman Jesús Gil.

Setién then moved to CD Logroñés in 1988 where, after a slow start, he was essential in helping the Riojans retain their top-tier status. The 34-year-old returned to Racing in 1992, and scored a career-best 11 goals in the first year in his second spell as the side returned to the top flight. He played three more years with the latter, and retired in June 1996 at nearly 38 after featuring for Levante UD in the Segunda División B play-offs, which also ended in promotion.

In 2001, Setién was voted by Racing's fans as their best player of all time. He appeared in almost 600 official matches in nearly two decades of play, totalling 95 league goals.

International
Setién appeared three times for Spain and was selected for the 1986 FIFA World Cup squad, but did not leave the bench during the tournament in Mexico. His debut came on 20 November 1985 in a 0–0 friendly with Austria, in Zaragoza.

Coaching career

Early career
Setién began working as a manager on 5 October 2001, succeeding the dismissed Gustavo Benítez at a Racing side that had started poorly following relegation to Segunda División. He took the team from 17th to promotion as runners-up to Atlético, but left at the end of the season due to pressure and handed the reins to his former teammate Manuel Preciado.

For the 2003–04 campaign, Setién returned to the second division with Polideportivo Ejido. He was dismissed on 17 November, with the team in the relegation zone.

In 2005, Setién was appointed assistant coach to the Russia national beach soccer team. For three months during the following year, he was in charge of Equatorial Guinea. After that he moved to another team he played for, Logroñes in division three, being relieved of his duties midway through the 2007–08 campaign.

Lugo
In June 2009, Setién became CD Lugo's coach. He led the side to promotion to the second tier in his third year, a second-ever for the Galicians.

In the following three years they managed to stay afloat, ranking between positions 11th and 15th.

Las Palmas
On 19 October 2015, following the dismissal of Paco Herrera, Setién became the new manager of UD Las Palmas in the top flight. He arrived with them in the relegation zone, and led them to 11th place in his first season.

On 18 March 2017, Setién announced that he would leave the Canary Islands club at the end of the campaign due to disputes with the board.

Betis
On 26 May 2017, Setién was appointed manager of Real Betis on a three-year deal. He led the team to the sixth place in his first year, with the subsequent qualification to the group stage of the UEFA Europa League.

Setién was linked with a move to FC Barcelona in January 2019, but it did not materialise. On 19 May, he announced that he would leave the Estadio Benito Villamarín.

Barcelona
Setién signed as head coach of Barcelona on 13 January 2020, replacing the dismissed Ernesto Valverde on a contract lasting to June 2022. In his first match in charge, six days later, he managed a 1–0 home victory over Granada CF.

The team eventually finished the domestic league in second position, behind Real Madrid. On 14 August 2020, they lost 8–2 to FC Bayern Munich in the quarter-finals of the UEFA Champions League, which was the first time in 74 years that the club had conceded eight goals in a game; it was also the first loss by a six-goal margin since 1951. He was officially dismissed three days later, subsequently confirming he would take legal actions as he felt the terms of his contract were not respected.

Villarreal
Setién returned to management on 25 October 2022, replacing Aston Villa-bound Unai Emery at the helm of Villarreal CF.

Personal life
Setién's son, Laro, is also a footballer and a midfielder. His father-in-law José Antonio Lozano played in the Spanish second tier in the early 1960s, and all three relatives represented Racing Santander. In addition to his native Spanish, he also speaks English and Italian.

Setién is a keen chess player with a FIDE rating of 2055. He played matches against former world champions Garry Kasparov and Anatoly Karpov, of which the results were not made public. He mentioned the game as an influence on his football tactics, which prioritised possession and midfield domination.

In April 2020, in an interview with TV3, he talked about winning La Liga and Champions League titles, when he said: "If it can be both, better. And of course I have dreamed of walking around Liencres with the cows while holding up the Champions League trophy and showing it to them."

Managerial statistics

Honours

Player
Atlético Madrid
Supercopa de España: 1985
UEFA Cup Winners' Cup runner-up: 1985–86

References

External links

1958 births
Living people
Spanish footballers
Footballers from Santander, Spain
Association football midfielders
La Liga players
Segunda División players
Segunda División B players
Racing de Santander players
Atlético Madrid footballers
CD Logroñés footballers
Levante UD footballers
Spain under-21 international footballers
Spain international footballers
1986 FIFA World Cup players
Spanish beach soccer players
Spanish football managers
La Liga managers
Segunda División managers
Segunda División B managers
Racing de Santander managers
Polideportivo Ejido managers
CD Logroñés managers
CD Lugo managers
UD Las Palmas managers
Real Betis managers
FC Barcelona managers
Villarreal CF managers
Equatorial Guinea national football team managers
Spanish expatriate football managers
Expatriate football managers in Equatorial Guinea
Spanish expatriate sportspeople in Equatorial Guinea